The 1958–59 Boston Celtics season was the 13th season for the franchise in the National Basketball Association (NBA). The Celtics finished the season by winning the first of eight consecutive NBA World Championships, and their second title overall.

Regular season

Season standings

Record vs. opponents

Game log

Playoffs

|- align="center" bgcolor="#ccffcc"
| 1
| March 18
| Syracuse
| W 131–109
| Tom Heinsohn (28)
| Bill Russell (32)
| —
| Boston Garden
| 1–0
|- align="center" bgcolor="#ffcccc"
| 2
| March 21
| @ Syracuse
| L 118–120
| Bob Cousy (27)
| Bill Russell (19)
| —
| Onondaga War Memorial
| 1–1
|- align="center" bgcolor="#ccffcc"
| 3
| March 22
| Syracuse
| W 133–111
| Frank Ramsey (24)
| Bill Russell (27)
| —
| Boston Garden
| 2–1
|- align="center" bgcolor="#ffcccc"
| 4
| March 25
| @ Syracuse
| L 107–119
| Frank Ramsey (29)
| Bill Russell (21)
| —
| Onondaga War Memorial
| 2–2
|- align="center" bgcolor="#ccffcc"
| 5
| March 28
| Syracuse
| W 129–108
| Bob Cousy (27)
| Bill Russell (32)
| —
| Boston Garden
| 3–2
|- align="center" bgcolor="#ffcccc"
| 6
| March 29
| @ Syracuse
| L 121–133
| Frank Ramsey (26)
| Bill Russell (24)
| —
| Onondaga War Memorial
| 3–3
|- align="center" bgcolor="#ccffcc"
| 7
| April 1
| Syracuse
| W 130–125
| Frank Ramsey (28)
| Bill Russell (32)
| Bob Cousy (10)
| Boston Garden
| 4–3
|-

|- align="center" bgcolor="#ccffcc"
| 1
| April 4
| Minneapolis
| W 118–115
| Frank Ramsey (29)
| Bill Russell (28)
| Boston Garden8,195
| 1–0
|- align="center" bgcolor="#ccffcc"
| 2
| April 5
| Minneapolis
| W 128–108
| Bill Sharman (28)
| Bill Russell (30)
| Boston Garden11,082
| 2–0
|- align="center" bgcolor="#ccffcc"
| 3
| April 7
| @ Minneapolis
| W 123–110
| Tom Heinsohn (26)
| Bill Russell (30)
| St. Paul Auditorium11,272
| 3–0
|- align="center" bgcolor="#ccffcc"
| 4
| April 9
| @ Minneapolis
| W 118–113
| Bill Sharman (29)
| Bill Russell (30)
| Minneapolis Auditorium8,124
| 4–0
|-

Roster

Awards and honors
 Bob Cousy, All-NBA First Team
 Bill Russell, All-NBA First Team
 Bill Sharman, All-NBA First Team

References

 Celtics on Database Basketball
 Celtics on Basketball Reference

Boston Celtics seasons
NBA championship seasons
Boston Celtics
Boston Celtics
Boston Celtics
1950s in Boston